Nukunu are an Aboriginal Australian people of South Australia, living around the Spencer Gulf area. In the years after British colonisation of South Australia, the area was developed to contain the cities of Port Pirie and Port Augusta.

Name
Both the Ngaiawang people of the Lower Murray and the Adelaide region's Kaurna used their variant pronunciation for the Nukuni, nokunno and nokuna, to signify an assassin, a mythical figure who was given to roaming about at night in search of people to kill.

Language

Nukunu language, together with Ngadjuri, with which it has a 90% overlap, is broadly classified by Luise Hercus, following the taxonomy of Wilhelm Schmidt, as belonging to the Miru cluster of the Thura-Yura languages.

Country

This lay on the eastern side of Spencer Gulf, from a point just north of the mouth of the Broughton River and the vicinity of Crystal Brook to Port Augusta. Their eastern extension ran to Melrose, Mount Remarkable, Gladstone, and Quorn, and they were also present at Baroota.

Native title
In 2019, the Nukunu people were granted native title over Port Pirie and part of the Flinders Ranges. On 3 February 2022, after a protracted 28-year dispute over boundaries, they were also given title over a large area east of Port Augusta by a sitting of the Federal Court of Australia. Only one of the original claimants,  elder Lindsay Thomas, was still alive. This area borders an area granted to the Barngarla people in September 2021. All three court sittings and decisions were presided over by Justice Natalie Charlesworth.

Social customs
The Nukunu were the southeasternmost tribe that adopted not only circumcision but also subincision as part of their rite of initiating young males into full tribal status. The Nukunu took pride in being "ritual purists".

A. P. Elkin established that the Nukunu represented the most southeasterly tribe maintaining a matrilineal moiety system, involving two marriage moieties, the Mathari and the Kararru. The system was essentially akin to that existing among the Barngarla, Adnyamathanha and Wailpi.

Culture
The Nukunu land was full of sacred sites, and formed the starting point for the longest songline registered in Australia, the Urumbula songline. This songline extends from a large tree, representing also the Milky Way, said to stand near the present day Port Augusta Hospital (Point Augusta) northwards right to the Gulf of Carpentaria. The story cycle dealt with the wanderings of the western quoll. The Arerrnte central desert people retain details of the mythical events that are located far south, in Nukunu tribal lands.

History of contact
Colonisation of the area began in 1849, and a late estimate is that the tribe consisted of between 50 and 100 people. Before this, it is thought that the Nukunu had been ravaged by the spread of smallpox from the Murray River, some two decades earlier. The subsequent transformation of the land for pastoral and wheat-growing purposes devastated the Nukunu.

In late June 1852 Ferguson rounded up seven Nukunu after pursuing them to retrieve 54 sheep that had been taken from his flocks and they were remanded at Clare County Court for trial in Adelaide, but were released after two months when no plaintiffs appeared to assist the prosecution. In 1854, after cattle had been pilfered, Ferguson, together with his stockmen, killed a group of local Aboriginal people at Crystal Brook. Writing in 1880, J. C. Valentine stated that only eight Nukunu had survived these radical upheavals, five men and three women; the rest, in his view, had expired from phthisis.

This enclosure of their tribal lands for pastoralism led to the dispossession, and decimation, of the Nukunu from the end of the 1840s onwards, and small remnants took refuge in scattered camps around Orroroo, Melrose, Wilmington, Stirling North, and Baroota. Some Nukunu managed to keep alive their direct attachment to their traditional lands by remaining at Port Germein, the Baroota reserve set aside for them, and at Port Augusta. With their fragmentation and dispersion, they could no longer adhere to their rigorous rules, and subsequently intermarried with people with Narungga, Barngarla and Wirangu descent, while maintaining a keen sense of their Nukunu identity.

Alternative names

 Barutadura (men of Baroota)
 Doora
 Eura (generic ethnonym for several tribes)
 Nookoona, Nukunna, Noocoona, Nokunna
 Nu-guna
 Nugunu
 Nukuna (Barngarla exonym)
 Nukunnu
 Pukunna (misprint)
 Tura (man)
 Tyura
 Warra (name of language)
 Wongaidja

Some words
 kutnyu (whiteman/ghost)
 ngami/ngangkayi (mother, breast, Milky Way)
 nhantu  (western grey kangaroo)
 nyilka (dog); katli (dog, wild or tame); wilka (dog, dingo)
 yartli (father)

Notable Nukunu people
 Jared Thomas, author, academic and museum curator

Footnotes

References

Citations

Sources

Aboriginal peoples of South Australia